The 260s decade ran from January 1, 260, to December 31, 269.

Significant people

References